State Route 211 (SR 211) is a Washington state highway located in Pend Oreille County. The roadway serves as a bypass of Newport. SSH 6B was later renumbered to SR 311 in 1964 during the highway renumbering. After SR 20 was extended east over SR 31, the highway was renumbered to SR 211.

Route description

After the intersection, the road travels northwest to Sacheen Lake and north to Deer Valley before continuing northbound to Davis Lake. North of the US 2 intersection, an estimated 2,200 motorists utilized Lewis Street daily based on average annual daily traffic (AADT) data collected by the Washington State Department of Transportation.

History

US 195 later became  in 1948, as part of a westward expansion. The Washington State Legislature renumbered and changed the system in 1964, PSH 6 became SR 31 and SSH 6B became SR 311.  was later extended east over the route of SR 31 in 1973 and SR 311 was renumbered to SR 211 in 1975.

Major intersections

References

External links

Highways of Washington State

211
Transportation in Pend Oreille County, Washington